Liam Fairhurst (26 February 1995 – 30 June 2009) was a British charity fundraiser who had been diagnosed with synovial sarcoma. He was diagnosed with the disease in his leg in 2005, and large portions of his leg muscles had to be removed. The cancer eventually spread to his lungs.  By the time of his death, he had collected almost £320,000, mainly for children's cancer charity CLIC Sargent.

Born in Soham, Cambridgeshire, Fairhurst began charity work after his friend, Jack Wilkinson, died of cancer in 2006, aged 12. He decided to raise money for a holiday home in Yorkshire for families living with childhood cancer. Barely able to walk, he began fundraising with a one-mile swim in 2006.

Fairhurst's courage impressed and inspired people such as Prime Minister Gordon Brown and his wife Sarah Brown. After Fairhurst's death, Brown said: "Liam was a courageous young man who showed immense bravery in the face of his illness. It was a privilege to meet him - his dedication as a fundraiser was an encouragement to us all and I am very proud of what Liam achieved. His courage will be a continuing inspiration to all those that knew him. My thoughts are with his family at this sad time."

Awards
 Voted Britain's Kindest Kid in a Five News/Charities Aid Foundation (CAF) competition 
 Diana Award, June 2007 
 Child of Courage awards, 2008, presented by Sir Richard Branson and Rebecca Adlington, at the Daily Mirror's "Pride of Britain" Awards in London

References

External links
Liam Fairhurst Official site

1995 births
2009 deaths
Deaths from cancer in England
Neurological disease deaths in England
Deaths from synovial sarcoma
People from Soham
Charity fundraisers (people)
20th-century philanthropists